Arborophila is a bird genus in the family Phasianidae. The genus has the second most members within the Galliformes after Pternistis, although Arborophila species vary very little in bodily proportions with different species varying only in colouration/patterning and overall size. These are fairly small, often brightly marked partridges found in forest of eastern and southern Asia. Some species in this genus have small ranges, and are threatened by habitat loss and hunting.

Taxonomy
The genus Arborophila was introduced in 1837 by the English naturalist Brian Houghton Hodgson to accommodate a single species, the hill partridge, which is therefore the type species. The genus name combines the Latin arbor, arboris meaning "tree" with the Ancient Greek philos meaning "-loving".

Species
While most species in this genus are highly distinctive and their taxonomic treatment is settled, there are three complexes where the species limits have not been entirely resolved and to various degrees are disputed: A. orientalis–sumatrana–campbelli–rolli complex, A. cambodiana complex, and A. chloropus–merlini–charltonii complex.  A. torqueola is always called the hill partridge or common hill-partridge, but in all other species "hill" is often disregarded (for example, A. rufipectus  is variously known as the Sichuan hill-partridge or Sichuan partridge). The genus contains 19 species.

References

Further reading

 
Bird genera
Taxonomy articles created by Polbot